Pteroodes is a genus of moths in the subfamily Arctiinae. The genus was erected by Arthur Gardiner Butler in 1877.

Species
Pteroodes longipennis (Walker, 1854) Mexico
Pteroodes clitus (Druce, 1884) Costa Rica

References

Arctiini